The Sailors of the Imperial Guard were a naval unit within Napoleon's Imperial Guard. The unit's soldiers not only operated as naval infantry but as gunners (after the training they had received in naval gunnery), sailors and engineers. Napoleon himself stated, "They were good sailors, then they were the best soldiers. And they did everything - they were soldiers, gunners, sappers, everything!".

History 
When Napoleon was crowned emperor on 2 December 1804, the Consular Guard's Marine battalion consisted of 820 officers, non-commissioned officers and ratings. Napoleon integrated that battalion into the Imperial Guard in 5 crews totalling 818 officers and men. Its ranks were those of the navy, not the army, and each crew was commanded by a Capitaine de frégate or Capitaine de vaisseau and four other officers, with 15 non-commissioned officers and 125 ratings.

The new unit's first task was to form part of the force at Boulogne for the Napoleon's planned invasion of the United Kingdom. They built boats for the force and served in their primary role as an elite unit to bolster naval crews, which often had little training or experience. When the invasion was called off, part of the unit fought in the 1805 Austrian campaign, fighting at Ulm and Austerlitz. Then, in 1806, 102 men from the unit took part in the Prussian campaign, fighting at Jena and especially in the siege of Danzig, where they formed part of Chasseloup-Laubat's force of engineers. Finally, they followed the Grande Armée into Poland, where they were re-joined by the crews who had remained in France. Together they then fought at Eylau and Friedland.

After the peace of Tilsit, the unit was sent back to France but left for the Peninsular War soon afterwards. Under the orders of general Dupont, they took an active part in the battle of Bailén, where they suffered heavy losses. The survivors were taken prisoner and sent to Cádiz on barges, where some remained until 1814. The unit had to be re-formed from scratch in March 1809 but was now only a single crew of 150 officers and men, which fought at Wagram led by Capitaine de vaisseau Pierre Baste, mainly as gunners.

In September 1810, 8 more crews were added, raising the unit's strength to 1,136 officers, NCOs and ratings. It suffered badly in the Invasion of Russia, fighting in several battles and decimated by cold, hunger and disease - only 85 of its officers and men were still alive when the army crossed back into Germany. Reorganised and brought up to strength with new recruits, the unit fought at Leipzig as part of the Young Guard's infantry.

In 1814 the unit took part in the French campaign, notably the defence of Paris. A small detachment of 21 sailors from the unit accompanied Napoleon into exile on Elba. During the Hundred Days, one crew of 150 was re-formed, which fought at Ligny and Waterloo - at the latter, they covered the retreat of the 1st Grenadier Regiment and 1st Foot Chasseurs of the Old Guard. They were finally disbanded on 15 August 1815.

Uniform
The uniform consisted of a blue tunic and Hungarian-style trousers. The tunic had red cuffs, decorations in the dolman style and scale epaulettes. The shako was black with a scarlet plume and an eagle helmet plate, and the shoes, waistbelt and cross-belt were also black. The waistbelt was in the light cavalry style.

Commanders 

 1805 : François Henri Eugène Daugier
 1809 : Pierre Baste
 1810 : Antoine Vattier
 1811 : Honoré Joseph Antoine Ganteaume
 1813 : Louis Pierre François Ricard Barthélémy de Saizeu
 1815 : Capitaine de frégate François Louis Taillade

References

1804 establishments in France
French naval components
Marine corps units and formations
Military units and formations disestablished in 1815
Regiments of Napoleon I's Imperial Guard